BNS Sher-e-Bangla is the first full-fledged naval base being developed for the Bangladesh Navy as part of the development vision of Bangladesh Armed Forces Forces Goal 2030. With an area of 500 acres this will be the largest naval base of the Bangladesh Navy. Of that area 200 acres of land will be devoted to the naval base and 300 acres for naval aviation and submarine operations. It is named after the 1st Prime Minister of Bengal, A. K. Fazlul Huq, who was known as Sher-e-Bangla or the Tiger of Bengal.

History 
On 20 November 2013 Prime Minister Sheikh Hasina laid the foundation for BNS Sher-e-Bangla at Rabnabad, Patuakhali. On 2 January 2018 the executive committee of the National Economic Council (ECNEC) approved a project titled 'Establishment of BNS Sher-e-Bangla Patuakhali', worth Taka 1,081.50 crore. The project will be overseen by The Ministry of Defence, Bangladesh Navy and the Engineer in Chief Section of Bangladesh Army. Construction is still underway as of December 2021.

Functions 
According to Bangladeshi officials the main role and functions of this base will be to provide maritime and coastal protection, air support at the seaport and its adjacent areas, and resistance to attack from external enemies.

References 

Bangladesh Navy bases
Shore establishments of the Bangladesh Navy